Christopher Carl Singleton Jr. (born November 21, 1989) is an American professional basketball player for Anadolu Efes of the Turkish Basketball Super League and the EuroLeague. Listed at 6'9" (2.06 m), he plays as a power forward and small ball center. He played college basketball for the Florida State Seminoles.

High school career
Singleton attended both Cherokee High School and Dunwoody High School.

Considered a five-star recruit by Rivals.com, Singleton was listed as the No. 3 small forward and the No. 12 player in the nation in 2008.

College career
Singleton played three years of college basketball for Florida State University's Seminoles, where he earned ACC Defensive Player of the Year honors in 2011. After losing in the Sweet Sixteen of the 2011 NCAA Tournament, Singleton decided to leave FSU and declared himself eligible for the 2011 NBA draft.

Professional career
On June 23, 2011, Singleton was selected by the Washington Wizards with the 18th overall pick in the 2011 NBA draft. On December 9, 2011, he signed with the Wizards. On March 22, 2012, he tied his career high 16 points in an 83-85 loss to the Indiana Pacers.

On September 5, 2014, Singleton signed with the Indiana Pacers. However, he was later waived by the Pacers on October 25, 2014. On October 31, 2014, he signed with the Jiangsu Dragons of the Chinese Basketball Association. In December 2014, he left Jiangsu after appearing in 17 games. On January 23, 2015, he was acquired by the Oklahoma City Blue of the NBA Development League.

On September 24, 2015, Singleton signed with the Russian team Lokomotiv Kuban for the 2015–16 season. In June 2016, he signed in China with the Anhui Dragons for the 2016 NBL season, where he won the championship and was named finals MVP.

On July 1, 2016, Singleton signed a one-year deal (with a team option for a second year) with Greek club Panathinaikos.

On July 17, 2018, Singleton signed a one-year deal with FC Barcelona Lassa of the Liga ACB and the EuroLeague.

On September 10, 2019, he signed with Anadolu Efes of the Turkish Super League.

Career statistics

NBA

Regular season

|-
| style="text-align:left;"| 
| style="text-align:left;"| Washington
| 66 || 51 || 21.7 || .372 || .346 || .682 || 3.5 || .7 || 1.1 || .5 || 4.6
|-
| style="text-align:left;"| 
| style="text-align:left;"| Washington
| 57 || 11 || 16.2 || .382 || .194 || .571 || 3.2 || .6 || .7 || .4 || 4.1
|-
| style="text-align:left;"| 
| style="text-align:left;"| Washington
| 25 || 0 || 10.0 || .373 || .368 || .720 || 2.2 || .2 || .4 || .1 || 3.0
|-
| align="left" | Career
| align="left" | 
| 148 || 62 || 17.6 || .376 || .319 || .633 || 3.2 || .6 || .8 || .4 || 4.1

EuroLeague

|-
| style="text-align:left;"| 2015–16
| style="text-align:left;" rowspan=1| Lokomotiv Kuban
| 31 || 6 || 21.4 || .415 || .316 || .730 || 4.5 || 1.0 || 1.2 || 0.6 || 8.4 || 8.9 
|-
| style="text-align:left;"| 2016–17
| style="text-align:left;" rowspan=2| Panathinaikos
| 33 || 29 || 28.1 || .541 || .436 || .748 || 5.9 || 1.2 || 1.2 || 1.0 || 12.0 ||15.6
|-
| style="text-align:left;"| 2017–18
| 34 || 34 || 30.1 || .404 || .461 || .732 || 5.8 || 1.1 || 1.0 || 0.7 || 10.3 ||12.5
|- class="sortbottom"
| style="text-align:left;"| Career
| style="text-align:left;"|
| 98 || 66 || 26.5 || .470 || .404 || .736 || 5.4 || 1.1 || 1.1 || 0.8 || 10.2 || 12.3

Personal life
Singleton is the son of Stephanie Langston and Carl Singleton.

References

External links
 eurobasket.com profile
 EuroLeague profile

1989 births
Living people
20th-century African-American people
21st-century African-American sportspeople
African-American basketball players
American expatriate basketball people in China
American expatriate basketball people in Greece
American expatriate basketball people in Russia
American expatriate basketball people in Spain
American expatriate basketball people in Turkey
American men's basketball players
Anadolu Efes S.K. players
Anhui Dragons players
Basketball players from Georgia (U.S. state)
Centers (basketball)
Dunwoody High School alumni
FC Barcelona Bàsquet players
Florida State Seminoles men's basketball players
Jiangsu Dragons players
Liga ACB players
McDonald's High School All-Americans
Oklahoma City Blue players
Panathinaikos B.C. players
Parade High School All-Americans (boys' basketball)
PBC Lokomotiv-Kuban players
People from Cherokee County, Georgia
Power forwards (basketball)
Sportspeople from the Atlanta metropolitan area
Washington Wizards draft picks
Washington Wizards players